Phantom is a South Korean spy action film based on Mai Jia's 2007 novel, Feng Sheng. It was directed by Lee Hae-young, starring Sol Kyung-gu, Lee Hanee, Park So-dam, Park Hae-soo, and Seo Hyun-woo. It was released theatrically on January 18, 2023.

Synopsis 
In 1933, during the Japanese colonization of Korea, the story begins with an underground anti-Japanese organization's failed attempt to assassinate the new Japanese resident-general on his first day in Seoul. The Japanese colonial government gathers five suspects in a remote hotel on a seaside cliff to hunt down "phantom," a spy planted by an anti-Japanese organization in Gyeongseong, within a day. Caught up in the game of life and under close scrutiny by the Japanese authorities, the suspects snoop around the rooms and search others' belongings to clear their suspicions.

Cast

Main 
 Sol Kyung-gu as Junji Murayama
 A Japanese police officer who used to be a soldier, but was deposed from the Police Department and dispatched as a communication officer and supervisor within the Government-General.
 Lee Hanee as Park Cha-Kyung
 An employee of the communication department that records cryptograms.
 Park So-dam as Yuriko
 A powerful figure in the Joseon government-general, who became the direct secretary of the general political affairs chief even though she is a Korean.
 Park Hae-soo as Kaito
 The captain who directs the entrapment investigation to find the spy within the Governor-General.
 Seo Hyun-woo as Cheong Gye-jang
 A timid character with sharp deciphering skills as a communication and code cracker.

Supporting 
 Kim Dong-hee as Baek-Ho
 A young employee who works in the communication department with Park Cha-kyung.
Esom as Nan-yeong
 Another spy who is active as a member of the anti-Japanese organization Black Corps.

Special appearance 

 Kim Jong-soo as a projectionist at the Golden Hall theater
 Lee Joo-young a ticket office worker
 Kim Joong-hee as Tadashi
 Bibi as a new secretary of the Chief of Government Affairs

Production 
Principal photography began on January 4, 2021 and ended on May 21.

Release and reception 
The film was released on January 18, 2023 on 1099 screens. The opening recorded 41,499 admissions.

, with gross of US$5,199,476 and 648,652 admissions, it is the second highest-grossing Korean film of 2023.

References

External links
 
 
 
 
 

2020s South Korean films
2020s Korean-language films
South Korean spy action films
4DX films
IMAX films
Films set in 1933
Films set in hotels
Films set in Korea under Japanese rule
Films based on Chinese novels